A shipwreck is the term for a sunken or derelict ship.

Shipwreck may also refer to:

Arts and entertainment
 Shipwreck (book), a 1974 book with text by John Fowles and photographs by the Gibsons of Scilly
 Shipwreck (film), a 1931 animated film starring Oswald the Lucky Rabbit
 Shipwreck (1978 film) or The Sea Gypsies, an American film directed by Stewart Raffill
 Shipwreck (G.I. Joe), a fictional character in the G.I. Joe universe
 Shipwreck, a 1994 album by Chris Connelly
 "Shipwreck!", an episode of  the anime series The Little Prince
 "Shipwreck", a song by Your Memorial from the album Redirect
 Shipwreck (play), a 2019 play by Anne Washburn

Other uses
 P-700 Granit, Soviet and Russian anti-ship missile with the NATO reporting name "Shipwreck"
 Alvin "Shipwreck" Kelly (1885 or 1893–1952), American pole sitter
 Shipwreck Kelly (American football) (1910–1986), American National Football League player, banker, and real estate investor
 Shipwreck Bay, New Zealand

See also
 Shipwrecked (disambiguation)
 Shipwrecking, an accident at sea when a ship sinks
 Ship breaking
 
 

Lists of people by nickname